Ignacy Gepner (September 3, 1802 in Płock – July 30, 1867) was a Polish painter.

Between 1824 and 1826, he studied at the University of Warsaw under the guidance of Aleksander Kokular. His artwork includes portraits as well as generic scenes from the lives of the town dwellers and workers. He also created lithography.

References

External links

1802 births
1867 deaths
19th-century Polish painters
19th-century Polish male artists
Polish male painters